Anthidium pontis is a species of bee in the family Megachilidae, the leaf-cutter, carder, or mason bees.

Synonyms
Synonyms for this species include:
Anthidium karossense Mavromoustakis, 1940
Anthidium (Pontanthidium) pontis Cockerell, 1933

References

pontis
Insects described in 1933